Greece participated in the Eurovision Song Contest 1980 with the song "Autostop" performed by Anna Vissi and The Epikouri. The act had been selected by a jury during a twelve act national final organized by the Hellenic Broadcasting Corporation (ERT).

Greece performed third at the event, held on 19 April 1980, in The Hague, Netherlands, and placed 13th with 30 points. This tied the nation's lowest placement in the contest.

Background

Prior to the 1980 contest, Greece had participated in the Eurovision Song Contest five times since its first entry in 1974.

Before Eurovision

National final 
The final took place on 10 March 1980, at the ERT TV Studios in Peania and was hosted by Vasilis Tsivilikas. The winning song was chosen by a jury of people who awarded each song a mark out of ten.

At Eurovision
The Eurovision Song Contest 1980 was held on 19 April 1980, at the Nederlands Congresgebouw in The Hague, Netherlands. "Autostop" was the third performed that night (following Turkey's Ajda Pekkan with "Pet'r Oil" and preceding Luxembourg's Sophie & Magaly with "Papa Pingouin"). At the close of voting, it had received 30 points, placing 13th in a field of 19.

Voting

References 

1980
Countries in the Eurovision Song Contest 1980
Eurovision
Anna Vissi